The Swissmill Tower, also known as Kornhaus, is the tallest operating grain elevator in the world.

History and description 
The Swissmill Tower is a grain elevator close to Limmatplatz in Zürich. It was built near the Migros Tower, replacing a former grain elevator after the city voted in favor of building a larger silo. The original mill (Kornhaus) was built in 1843 on the same site.

This required as many as 60 construction workers processing concrete in three shifts around the clock. The construction took place in two stages. The first phase was completed in early July 2015. The second began in September 2015, and end in April 2016. Mill operations continued during construction. The works were carried out by Implenia.

Significance 
At , the Swissmill Tower is the tallest operating grain elevator in the world.

The Swissmill Tower can store 40,000 tonnes of grain. Swissmill is the largest mill company in Switzerland, processing 800 tons of grain daily. This represents 30% of the Swiss national grain requirements. It supplies flour for Swiss retailers Coop, Volg and Landi.

Critics have said the silo's exterior and height are overly industrial. However, municipal authorities say that the silo was intentionally designed in that way. Its external appearance is intended to express its interior – an industrial plant.

In July 2016, there was a proposal to cover the tower's exterior with plants, in response to a request by Zürich politicians to redo the facade. Architect Miriam Vázquez suggested this during the planning phase, but later deemed it too expensive.

References

External links 

Towers in Switzerland
Commercial buildings completed in 2016
2016 establishments in Switzerland
Buildings and structures in Zürich
Grain elevators
Agricultural buildings in Switzerland
21st-century architecture in Switzerland